Gary Stern is an American economist and banker.

Gary Stern may also refer to:

Gary Stern of Stern Pinball
Gary Stern, character in Daybreak (2019 TV series)
Gary Stern, co-owner of the Montreal Alouettes